Dhanwar may be:

The Dhanwar Rai language of Nepal
A purported language of the Dhanwar people of India, which does not actually exist